Collix adamata is a moth in the family Geometridae. It was described by Prout in 1941. It is found on Sulawesi.

The forewings are bister, the costa irrorate with warm buff, especially distad of the postmedial fascia, which is rather darker than the ground colour and very faintly marked. Distad of the postmedial fascia, the veins are marked each with a pair of warm buff spots. The hindwings are similarly marked, except for the warm buff costal irroration, which is not present.

References

adamata
Moths described in 1941
Taxa named by Louis Beethoven Prout